Orthaga phaeopteralis is a species of snout moth in the genus Orthaga. It was described by Oswald Bertram Lower in 1902. It is found in Australia (including Queensland) and Papua New Guinea.

References

Moths described in 1902
Epipaschiinae